Kollengode may refer to:
 Kollengode, a town in the Palakkad district, Kerala, India
 Kollengode Palace, a palace situated in Palakkad District, Kerala state, India
 Kollengode railway station, a railway station in Palakkad District, Kerala